Billy Burns (born 13 December 1969) is a former British male mountain runner, who won two medals at individual senior level  at the World Mountain Running Championships.

References

External links
 

1969 births
Living people
British male mountain runners